The British Royal Commission on Fuel and Engines was established in the United Kingdom on 31 July 1912, and its remit was "[t]o report on the means of supply and storage of Liquid Fuel in peace and war, and its application to warship engines, whether indirectly or by internal combustion." Established by Winston Churchill, First Lord of the Admiralty from 1911 to 1915, its commissioners were John Fisher, George Lambert, Thomas Boverton Redwood, Philip Watts, Henry John Oram, John Jellicoe, William Matthews, Thomas Henry Holland, Thomas Edward Thorpe, Alexander Gracie, Humphrey Owen Jones and Alfred Yarrow.

Oil integration 
Fisher's "quest" as First Sea Lord from 1904 to early 1910 was to modernise the Navy, and, as an "oil maniac", this included changing to the use of fuel oil instead of coal for propulsion: the benefits and availability of the technology were proven, for example through "vitally important" tests involving  in 1904, but the supply of oil was as yet unreliable. In 1903 Fisher had led an "Oil Fuel Committee" for the Admiralty, and as First Sea Lord he ordered more, smaller oil-burning warships for the Navy. As First Lord of the Admiralty, Churchill was convinced by Fisher's view of the Navy's needs, and became a "staunch proponent" of them. David Lloyd George, British prime minister from 1916 to 1922, regarded the Navy as Churchill's "obsession".

Churchill was concerned that Britain had inadequate storage and supplies of fuel oil for the Royal Navy. At the time of his appointment to the Admiralty, the Navy already had 189 oil-powered vessels built or under construction: these required "more than 200,000 tons of oil annually", while reserves of oil were only sufficient for 4 months. The principal issue was that, while Britain's internal supply of coal was plentiful, it had no such supply of oil, either domestically or within its empire. Further, a projection of the Navy's requirement for oil in 1912, produced by the Admiralty in December 1911 at Churchill's command, indicated that this would be "225 times" greater than the requirement 10 years previously. He appointed Fisher chairman of the Commission, and allowed him to choose its other members – all were "experts in petroleum, geology, engineering and shipbuilding." While standard warrants were published in The London Gazette, the Commission's reports, issued in November 1912, February 1913 and February 1914, were kept secret under the Official Secrets Act of 1911.

Support 
Some Navy officials showed outstanding support for the initiative. In 1914, Admiral John Jellicoe wrote to Fisher:
It [oil fuel] is also most a necessity for these vessels because of the great difficulty that they experience in our present battle cruisers of getting coal to the furnaces sufficiently rapidly to keep their full speed after they have reduced coal on board to from 50 to 60% of its full stowage.Great strides were made in oil innovations, thanks to the admiralty's support.

Resistance 
The first two reports recommended that storage be adequate for four years' supply. However, when signing them, Lambert, who was a Civil Lord of the Admiralty, added caveats that the quantity to be stored was estimated for peacetime, and that estimates for wartime were needed. Lambert also noted the importance of a continued coal supply, but the fact that none of the commissioners was an expert in coal "made its conclusions foregone." Among the most significant of these were that fuel oil was vital to the Navy; that it was best used in internal combustion engines; that the United Kingdom should keep large reserves of it; and that the Admiralty needed to become "a large-scale buyer". The Commission influenced the British government's decision in 1914 to buy a controlling, 51% stake in the Anglo-Persian Oil Company, of which BP is the successor.

Result 
Over the course of the three-year period, Fisher filed three reports on oil integration to Churchill. Churchill used these reports to establish three leading guidelines in oil integration:

 Dispersing Oil Supplies so as not to rely on a single source
 Promoting competition between oil companies
 Drawing Oil Supplies from areas in the British Empire.

References

Footnotes

Notes

Bibliography

British Royal Commissions